María Asunción Ballesté Huguet (born 12 December 1947) is a Spanish former swimmer. She competed in the women's 100 metre butterfly at the 1964 Summer Olympics.

References

External links
 

1947 births
Living people
Spanish female butterfly swimmers
Olympic swimmers of Spain
Swimmers at the 1964 Summer Olympics
Swimmers from Barcelona
20th-century Spanish women